Plaintiff S157/2002 v Commonwealth, also known as 'S157', is a decision of the High Court of Australia.

It is an important case in Australian Administrative Law, in particular for its holdings about Parliament's inability to restrict the availability of constitutional writs.

As of September 2020, 'S157' is the 12th most cited case of the High Court.

Background 
The plaintiff, wished to challenge a decision of the Refugee Review Tribunal denying him a protection visa. Two sections of the Migration Act 1958 (Cth) denied him the right to appeal the decision. The plaintiff applied to the High Court, arguing that the relevant sections did not apply to applications for relief under s75(v) of the Constitution. s474 purported to make certain decisions ("privative clause decisions") final and unreviewable, stating that such decisions are "not subject to prohibition, mandamus, injunction, declaration or certiorari in any court on any account". S486A placed time limits on applications to the High Court in respect of these decisions.

The plaintiff argued that s474 was directly inconsistent with s75(v) and therefore invalid.

The privative clause was based on that considered in R v Hickman, with Philip Ruddock, the Minister for Immigration, stating:

Members  may  be  aware  that  the  effect  of  a  privative clause  such  as that used in Hickman's case is to expand the legal validity of the acts done and the decisions made by decision-makers.  The result is to give decision  makers  wider  lawful  operation  for  their  decisions,  and  this means that the grounds on which those decisions can be challenged in the Federal and High Courts are narrower than currently.

Decision 

The Hickman principle was, the majority held, simply a rule of construction allowing apparently incompatible statutory provisions to be reconciled.

Two rules of construction relating to privative clauses were held to exist:
"if there is an opposition between the Constitution and any such provision, it should be resolved by adopting [an] interpretation [consistent with the Constitution if] that is fairly open." (per Hickman); and
Privative clauses are construed strictly.

Applying these principles led to the conclusion that although the two sections were valid, they did not apply to the plaintiff's action in the High Court because the section did not extend to decisions affected by jurisdictional error.  Gaudron, McHugh, Gummow, Kirby and Hayne JJ said:
104. The reservation to this Court by the Constitution of the jurisdiction in all matters in which the named constitutional writs or an injunction are sought against an officer of the Commonwealth is a means of assuring to all people affected that officers of the Commonwealth obey the law and neither exceed nor neglect any jurisdiction which the law confers on them. The centrality, and protective purpose, of the jurisdiction of this Court in that regard places significant barriers in the way of legislative attempts (by privative clauses or otherwise) to impair judicial review of administrative action.

Notes

References

External links 

High Court of Australia cases
2003 in Australian law
2003 in case law
Australian migration law